is a private women's university based at Kodaira, Tokyo. It is one of the oldest and most prestigious higher educational institutions for women in Japan, contributing to the advancement of women in society for more than a century.

History
The university was founded in 1900 by Tsuda Umeko as Joshi Eigaku Juku. The name was changed to Tsuda Eigaku Juku in 1933, then to Tsuda Juku Senmon Gakko, and finally Tsuda Juku Daigaku (Tsuda College) in 1948.

From April 2017 Tsuda was renamed, in English, to Tsuda University consisting of two colleges.
 The College of Liberal Arts at Kodaira Campus, Tokyo
 The College of Policy Studies at Sendagaya Campus, Tokyo

Notable alumnae
Taki Fujita, 4th president of Tsuda College (1962–1972)
Kumiko Haba, political scientist, international relations
Michiko Inukai, author
Ichiko Kamichika, politician
Mieko Kamiya, psychiatrist
Mitsuyo Kusano, newscaster
Yoriko Madoka, politician
Yoko Matsuoka McClain, Japanese language and literature professor
Chie Nakane, first-appointed female professor of Tokyo University
Tomoko Namba, founder and former CEO of DeNA Co., Ltd.
Emiko Ohnuki-Tierney, anthropologist
Natsuko Toda, translator
Akiko Yamanaka, politician
Noriko Yui, mathematician

List of Notable Alumnae

Faculty
Anna Cope Hartshorne
Yoshi Kasuya
Julie Beth Lovins
Kawai Michi
Tsuda Umeko
Elizabeth Gray Vining
Tetsuro Watsuji

External links
 Tsuda University English website
 Tsuda University Japanese website

References

 
Private universities and colleges in Japan
Women's universities and colleges in Japan
Kodaira, Tokyo
1900 establishments in Japan
Educational institutions established in 1900
Universities and colleges in Tokyo